Cherry Returns is a 2016 Chinese-Hong Kong suspense crime thriller film directed by Chris Chow and starring Song Jia, Gordon Lam and Cherry Ngan. It was released in China by EDKO (Beijing) Distribution on 30 December 2016. This 89 minutes movie is co-produced by Sil Metropole Organization, EDKO Film, Tianjin Chinese Entertainment, Shanghai Film Group, Yatai Weilai Entertainment (Beijing), and EDKO (Beijing) Distribution.

Synopsis
LAPD receives an anonymous tip off and locates a hideout where they believe young children are being held captive. During the raid, the kidnapping suspects are killed. A traumatized young girl is found alive in the basement, later identified as Cherry, who was abducted 12 years ago. Her family, who has since resided in Hong Kong, feels agitated upon the shocking news. In the wake of the trauma, Cherry appears to lose all recollection of her family and childhood. To cope with the aftermath and get her life back on track, her family takes her back to Hong Kong to start anew.

While Cherry is making progress in recovery, strange events occur that threaten to harm those close to her. Complicated by the appearance of a mysterious stranger, police investigator starts to look into Cherry’s past for lead. But what he is about to discover, no one is prepared for the fatal outcome that follows...

Cast

Other Cast

Reception
The film has grossed  in China.

References

External links
 
 Cherry Returns at cinema.com.hk

Chinese crime thriller films
Hong Kong crime thriller films
2016 crime thriller films
Chinese suspense films
Tangren Media films
2010s Hong Kong films
2010s Mandarin-language films